Fufu (or fufuo, foofoo, foufou   ) is a pounded meal found in West African cuisine.  It is a Twi word that originates from the Akans in Ghana. The word, however, has been expanded to include several variations of the pounded meal found in other African countries including Sierra Leone, Guinea, Liberia, Cote D'Ivoire, Benin, Togo, Nigeria, Cameroon, the Democratic Republic of Congo, the Central African Republic, the Republic of Congo, Angola and Gabon.

Although the original food ingredient for fufu is boiled cassava, plantains and Cocoyam, yams (Ghana), it is also made in different ways in other West African countries; each country has its unique way of making it. In Ghana, Ivory Coast and  Liberia, they use the method of separately mixing and pounding equal portions of boiled cassava with green plantain or cocoyam, or by mixing cassava/plantains or cocoyam flour with water and stirring it on a stove. Its thickness is then adjusted to personal preference, and it is eaten with broth-like soups. In Nigeria, fufu (akpu) is made solely from fermented cassava giving it its unique thickness compared to that found in other west African countries, and eaten with variety of soups with vegetables and lots of beef and fish.  In recent years other flours, such as semolina, maize flour, or mashed plantains, may take the place of cassava flour; this is common for those in diaspora or families that live in urban cities. Families in rural areas with access to farm land still maintain the original recipe of using cassava. Fufu is traditionally eaten with the fingers, and a small ball of it can be dipped into an accompanying soup or sauce.

Names 

 Angola: , 
 Benin: , 
 Cameroon: , 
 Central African Republic: 
 Gabon: 
 Germany: falsch
 Guinea: 
 Ivory Coast: , 
 Liberia: 
 Mozambique: sadja, sadza, xima 
 Sierra Leone: 
 Togo:

African fufu
Before the Portuguese traders introduced cassava to Africa from Brazil in the 16th century, fufu was mainly made from cocoyam, plantain and yams. The traditional method of eating fufu is to pinch some of the fufu off in one's right hand fingers and form it into an easily ingested round ball. The ball is then dipped in the soup before being eaten.

Fufu made in Cote d'Ivoire 
In Côte d'Ivoire, the word “foutou” is also used. Ivorian “foufou” is specifically sweet mashed plantains, whereas the “foutou” is a stronger, heavier paste made of various staple foods such as yam, cassava, plantains, taro or a mix of any of those.

In the French-speaking regions of Cameroon, it is called “couscous” (not to be confused with the North African dish couscous).

Although people from the Eastern Africa and Southern Africa seem to confuse Fufu/Fufuo to their type of corn or maize dough dish called Ugali or Nshima, it’s not the same rather Ugali or Nshima can be found in Ghana called Akple, Nsihoo( white Etsew without the corn bran) or Tuo zaafi which are made from unfermented corn flour unlike the other fermented corn dough foods such as Etsew, Dokuno(Kenkey), Banku, Fonfom, among others in the Ghanaian cuisines.

Fufu made in Ghana 

In Twi, fufu or fufuo means "mash or mix", a soft and doughy staple food. It is believed to originate in what is now modern-day Ghana, by the Asante, the Akuapem, the Akyem, the Bono and the Fante people of the Akan ethnic group of Ghana and now generally accepted across the country. "Fufuo" also means "white" in Twi, and is likely derived from the whitish colour of the cassava component in Ghanaian fufu. In Ghana, it is made out of pieces of boiled cassava and/or other tubers such as plantain or cocoyam. It is mostly pounded together in a locally made wooden mortar (woduro) using a wooden pestle (woma). In between blows from the pestle, the mixture is turned by hand and water is gradually added till it becomes slurry, soft and sticky. The mixture is then formed into a rounded slab and served. With the invention of the fufu machine preparation has become much less labour-intensive. The resulting food is eaten with liquid soups (nkwan) such as light soup (nkrakra nkwan), abenkwan (palm nut soup), nkatenkwan (peanut butter soup), and abunubunu soup. Today, it also features in Beninese cuisine, Cameroonian cuisine, Guinean cuisine, Nigerian cuisine, and Togolese cuisine, where it is eaten with hot pepper soup, okra, or other kinds of stew. Fufu's prevalence in West African subregions have been noted in literature produced by authors from that area. It is mentioned in Chinua Achebe's Things Fall Apart, for example. Fufu was a major cuisine of the Ashanti Empire. In Ghana, fufu, also known as fufuo, is white and sticky (if plantain is not mixed with the cassava when pounding).

Fufu or Akpu made in Nigeria 
In Nigeria, fufu or akpu is a popular food made from fresh or fermented cassava. The Nigeria's way and version of Fufu is different from Ghana's version of Fufu, it is however a staple food in both countries. Akpu, properly punctuated as akpụ in Igbo, is the Igbo word for cassava. Requiring several days to make, akpu is a wet paste often eaten with egusi soup. Akpu is traditionally made by peeling and washing raw cassava until it is white. Left in water for 3–4 days, the cassava ferments and becomes soft. It is then filtered with a porous calabash or sieve. Excess water is typically and quickly drained by pouring the wet paste into a sack, upon which is placed something heavy and flat (e.g., a plank and brick). The paste is then pounded and molded into large balls and simmered for 30–60 seconds, after which it is thoroughly pounded to remove lumps, molded again into smaller balls, boiled for 10–15 minutes, and then pounded until smooth.  It is popular throughout Nigeria, particularly in the East.

Caribbean fufu
In Caribbean nations with substantial populations of West African origin, such as Cuba, Jamaica, the Dominican Republic, Haiti and Puerto Rico, plantains, cassava or yams are mashed with other ingredients. In Cuba, the dish retains its original African stem name, termed simply as fufú or with added descriptive extensions like fufú de plátano or fufú de plátano pintón. On other major islands, fufú goes by the names of mangú in the Dominican Republic, mofongo and funche in Puerto Rico. What distinguishes the Caribbean "fufú" from its West African relative is a firmer texture with stronger flavors. As it moves away from Cuba, the fufú's core is less a gelatinous dough and more of a consistent mass.

In Haiti it is called tonm tonm and Foofoo. It is mostly made of breadfruit but can be made of plantain or yams and is usually served with an okra based stew or soup. It is primarily consumed in the southernmost regions of Haiti namely the Grand'Anse and Sud departments. The city of Jérémie is regarded as the tonmtonm capital of Haiti.

Puerto Rican mofongo, in keeping with the creolized cuisine traditions of the Caribbean, tends toward a fufú of much higher density and robust seasoning. While keeping a conspicuous African character, mofongo has borrowed from the island's Iberian culinary tradition, to create a dish made of fried green and yellow plantains, cassava or breadfruit. Unlike the mushier Caribbean and West African fufús, mofongo is generally firmer and crustier. To prepare mofongo, green plantains are deep-fried once unlike twice fried tostones. Next, they are mashed in a 'pilon' (mortar) with chopped garlic, salt, black pepper and olive oil. The resulting mash is then pressed and rounded into a hollowed crusty orb. Meat, traditionally chicharrón, is then stuffed into the chunky ball of fried green plantains. A few recipes call for a meat or vegetable salsa criolla" (related to American Creole sauce) poured on top of the hot sphere. In the trendier "mofongo relleno," typical of western Puerto Rico, seafood is all over, inside and outside. Traditional mofongo, as previously cited, comes seasoned and stuffed with meat and bathed in a chicken broth soup. Because of its elaborate process of preparation and its sundry ingredients, poet and blogger Arose N Daghetto called the mofongo a type of "fufú paella" and branded it as "the big daddy of fufús.".  Although mofongo is associated with being fried, boiled and roasting plantain mofongo predate fried mofongo and is still excited but a rare find in Puerto Rico. A dish called funche made with taro, green and yellow plantains boiled and mashed with butter, garlic, and pork fat was once popular in Puerto Rico. Once mashed it was formed into balls and eaten with broth made from sesame seeds. Funche is written in early Puerto Rican cookbooks around the 1800s, but can probably be traced back to African slaves on the island. Funche today in Puerto Rico is cornmeal cooked in coconut milk and milk.

The vegetable or fufú sauce in the Anglo-Caribbean is not fried first. Plantain is not used as much, as it is used in so many dishes. Fufu is usually part of, or added to, a soupy sauce or on the side with a soupy dish. In Antigua, fufu is served as part of the national dish but is called fungi/fungee and is made using cornmeal and okra. Similarly, in Barbados it serves as part of the national dish and is called cou-cou and uses cornmeal or, less commonly, breadfruit instead, like several other English Caribbean islands.

Nutrition
Nutritionally, 100 g dry weight fufu contains 2 g of protein, 0.1 g of fat and 84 g of carbohydrates. There are 267 kcal of food energy in a 100 g serving made up with water. It is very low in cholesterol and very rich in potassium, and it is commonly prescribed by doctors for people who have low level of potassium in their blood.

Gallery

See also

 African cuisine
 List of African dishes
 List of maize dishes
 Attiéké
 Asida
 Bazeen
 Congolese cuisine
 Cornmeal
 Couscous
 Eba
 Grits
 Mămăliga
 Mangú
 Mashed potato
 Mochi
 Mofongo
 Nshima
 Plakali
 Poi
 Polenta
 Ugali
Konkonte
Garri

References

Bibliography

External links
  Microwavable instant fufu.

Angolan cuisine
Belizean cuisine
Burkinabé cuisine
Cameroonian cuisine
Caribbean cuisine
Central African cuisine
Central African Republic cuisine
Costa Rican cuisine
Cuban cuisine
Democratic Republic of the Congo cuisine
Ecuadorian cuisine
Gabonese cuisine
Ghanaian cuisine
Guinean cuisine
Haitian cuisine
Igbo cuisine
Ivorian cuisine
Jamaican cuisine
Liberian cuisine
Maize dishes
Malian cuisine
National dishes
Nigerian cuisine
Panamanian cuisine
Republic of the Congo cuisine
Swallows (food)
Togolese cuisine
West African cuisine
Yoruba cuisine